The Last of Us is a 2013 action-adventure game developed by Naughty Dog and published by Sony Computer Entertainment. Players assume control of Joel (Troy Baker), escorting the young Ellie (Ashley Johnson) across a post-apocalyptic United States. The game's development was led by Bruce Straley and Neil Druckmann, as game director and creative director, respectively. The game was officially announced on December 10, 2011, and was widely anticipated. It was awarded Most Anticipated Game from PlayStation Universe, receiving a nomination in the same category at the 2012 Spike Video Game Awards.

Following its previews at the Electronic Entertainment Expo, the game won numerous awards, including Best of Show from several gaming publications. It was released worldwide on June 14, 2013, for the PlayStation 3, and in July 2014 for the PlayStation 4. Review aggregator Metacritic assigned the game a normalized score of 95 out of 100, indicating "universal acclaim", based on 98 reviews. Within three weeks of its release, The Last of Us sold approximately 3.4 million copies, and seven million by July 2014, becoming one of the best-selling PlayStation 3 games.

The Last of Us garnered awards and nominations in a variety of categories with particular praise for its story, sound and music, graphical and artistic design, and the acting of its cast. At the 10th British Academy Video Games Awards, the game received ten nominations and went on to win five awards: Best Game, Action & Adventure, Audio Achievement, Performer and Story. The game earned thirteen nominations at the 17th Annual DICE Awards, winning ten, including Game of the Year. At IGN's Best of 2013, the game garnered thirteen nominations and went on to win ten awards, including Game of the Year, Best Overall Action-Adventure Game and Best Overall Sound.

At the 14th Annual Game Developers Choice Awards, The Last of Us won Game of the Year, Best Design and Best Narrative. The game received seven nominations at the Spike VGX, with Troy Baker winning the award for Best Voice Actor and Ashley Johnson winning the award for Best Voice Actress. At the Game Audio Network Guild Awards, it received nine nominations, of which it won four: Audio of the Year, Sound Design of the Year, Best Audio Mix, and Best Dialogue. The game also appeared on several year-end lists of the best games of 2013, receiving Game of the Year wins from The Daily Telegraph, Good Game, Kotaku, and VideoGamer.com, among many others.

Accolades

References 

Last of Us, The
The Last of Us